The Seth Davis House is a historic house located at 32 Eden Avenue in Newton, Massachusetts.

Description and history 
The -story brick house was built in the 1820s by Seth Davis, a locally prominent teacher and real estate investor, and is one of the finest Greek Revival houses in the city. It is unusual for having brick detailing instead of wood for the cornices. Seth Davis was a major investor in West Newton's Railroad Hotel, and owned much land in the area. Davis Street, Davis Court, and the Davis School are all named in his honor.

The house was listed on the National Register of Historic Places on September 4, 1986.

See also
 Railroad Hotel
 National Register of Historic Places listings in Newton, Massachusetts

References

Houses on the National Register of Historic Places in Newton, Massachusetts
Houses completed in 1825
Greek Revival architecture in Massachusetts